Fred Mariani is a former American football coach. He served as the head football coach at  Iona College in New Rochelle, New York from 1998 to 2008, compiling a record of 46–68. He was the final head coach for the Iona Gaels football program, which was discontinued following the 2008 season.

Head coaching record

References

Year of birth missing (living people)
Living people
American football offensive linemen
Fordham Rams football coaches
Iona Gaels football coaches
Lehigh Mountain Hawks football coaches
Morehead State Eagles football coaches
Rutgers Scarlet Knights football coaches
Saint Joseph's Pumas football coaches
Saint Joseph's Pumas football players
Don Bosco Preparatory High School alumni
Players of American football from New Jersey